Luis Martínez Villicaña (April 1, 1939 – March 2, 2011) was a Mexican politician. He served as the Secretary of Agrarian Reform under Mexican President Miguel de la Madrid from December 1, 1982, until 1986. He left the Cabinet in 1986 upon his election as Governor of Michoacán and was succeeded by Rafael Rodríguez Barrera.

Martínez Villicaña served as Governor of Michoacán from February 15, 1986, until December 3, 1988.

Luis Martínez Villicaña died in Houston, Texas, on March 2, 2011, at the age of 71.

References

1939 births
2011 deaths
Governors of Michoacán
Mexican Secretaries of the Agrarian Reform
Institutional Revolutionary Party politicians
People from Uruapan
Politicians from Michoacán
20th-century Mexican politicians